Shankar Narayan Singh Deo (born 1922) is an Indian politician. He was elected to the Lok Sabha, lower house of the Parliament of India from Bankura, West Bengal in the 1971 Indian general election as a member of the Indian National Congress.

References

External links
Official biographical sketch in Parliament of India website

1922 births
Possibly living people
India MPs 1971–1977
Lok Sabha members from West Bengal
Indian National Congress politicians
Members of the Bihar Legislative Council
West Bengal MLAs 1957–1962
West Bengal MLAs 1962–1967
West Bengal MLAs 1967–1969